The Great Leap is the fifth album released by composer Phideaux Xavier.

In August 2005, while putting the finishing touches on 313, Xavier returned to the studio to record the first two parts of a projected "Trilogy" of albums dealing with "Big Brother" authoritarianism and ecological crisis. The Great Leap is part one of that trilogy, while part two, Doomsday Afternoon, released a year later. The album features shorter songs and is a return to the simpler song structures of Ghost Story.

Tracks
"Wake Up" (04:03)
"You and Me Against a World of Pain" (05:35)
"The Waiting" (03:33)
"Abducted" (06:10)
"Rainboy" (06:15)
"I Was Thinking" (04:24)
"Long and Lonely Way" (04:18)
"They Hunt You Down" (03:54)
"Tannis Root" (04:52)
"One Star" (05:14)
"Last" (05:50)

Phideaux Xavier albums
2006 albums